

Dorothy Walker

Dorothy Walker is a fictional character in Marvel Comics. She was created by Stuart Little and Ruth Atkinson and first appeared in Miss America Magazine #2 (November 1944). She was reintroduced in The Defenders #89 (November 1980) by David Michelinie and Mike Harris as a radical departure from her initial conception.

Dorothy Walker is introduced as Betty Walker, the typical doting mother of Patsy Walker. This existence is revealed to have been a comic book written by Dorothy and loosely inspired by the teenage Patsy's life. Because of this Patsy wass cared for by their housekeeper Dolly Donahue. While Dorothy bathes in the success of her comic, Patsy loathes it and their relationship is heavily strained. When she divorces her husband, Joshua, she gets custody of Patsy and her brother Mickey due to her wealth.

Dorothy does not approve of Patsy's marriage to Buzz Baxter and when the two end up divorcing, Dorothy loses contact with her daughter. Years later, Dorothy is stricken with cancer and dies before she is able to see Patsy again. Patsy realizes that despite her mother's sometimes cold attitude towards her, she was doing everything she could to forgive her. Unbeknownst to her, Dorothy attempted to make a deal with the demon Avarrish. In exchange for Patsy's soul, Dorothy would be restored to life without cancer. However, Avarrish fails and Dorothy remains dead.

Dorothy Walker in other media
Dorothy Walker appears in Jessica Jones, portrayed by Rebecca De Mornay. She is a talent agent and has a much more abusive relationship with her daughter. In the first season episode "AKA I've Got the Blues", Dorothy is shown exploiting her teenage daughter in a Disney Channel-esque show called It's Patsy. She adopts Jessica Jones into their family to make Trish's image more likable. In an effort to stop Dorothy from forcing Trish to vomit, Jessica tosses Dorothy across the room exposing her powers to her. Years later, Dorothy works at Stars & Tykes Talent Agency where her relationship with Trish is much worse than before. She claims to want to 'amend' their relationship when she really wants to exploit Trish's talk show host fame. Nevertheless, she helps Trish and Jessica out by digging up a file on the mysterious IGH. In the second season, Dorothy again impedes on Trish's life, though she approves of her daughter's relationship with ZCN reporter Griffin Sinclair. Later, it is revealed that she helped Griffin set up an elaborate proposal for Trish. When Trish turns him down, Dorothy berates her and Trish finally steps up to her mother and slaps her, telling her that she no longer wants the life that she was molded for. It is revealed that Dorothy was somewhat indirectly responsible for the death of Jessica's boyfriend Stirling. After escaping the IGH clinic, Alisa approaches Dorothy on the streets, claiming to be Jessica's math teacher. The two briefly connect over the difficulty of handling their daughters, and Alisa tells Dorothy where Jessica lives afterwards. When Trish ends up in the hospital due to Dr. Karl Malus's experiments, Dorothy meets with Jessica and admits that she does not blame her for Trish's decisions as they are the only family left. Later, Alisa tries to attack Trish at the hospital, killing Detective Sunday in the process, at which point Dorothy goes back to blaming Jessica, even though she inadvertently revealed Trish's location on the news. She continues watching over Trish, but is called out by Detective Costa, allowing Trish to escape the hospital. In the third season, Trish gets in a conflict with serial killer Gregory Salinger, which leads to Dorothy's torture and death.

Walking Stiletto
The Walking Stiletto is a robot supervillain created by Stan Lee, John Romita, Sr., and Sal Buscema, first appeared in Captain America #114 (June 1969). Within the context of the stories, the Walking Stiletto is a creation and agent of AIM. When Sharon Carter attacks a group of AIM leaders, they let loose the Stiletto to attack her, but she is saved by Captain America and Rick Jones, who destroy the robot. Many years later, the Walking Stiletto is among the robotic collection of the Reanimator, who unleashes it on Wolverine and Nova. Wolverine eviscerates the Walking Stiletto, rendering it inoperative.

During the "Iron Man 2020" event, Walking Stiletto was seen as a member of the A.I. Army.

Wallflower

Wal Rus
Wal Rus is an anthropomorphic walrus engineer who aids Rocket Raccoon in his fight in the Toy Wars of which his niece, Lylla, is the center of conflict. His metallic tusks are interchangeable and can be used as tools or weapons. His adventures with Rocket are later retconned when Rocket and Groot visit Halfworld and discover that the halfworlders are actually service animals for mental patients. Wal Rus serves as one of the security guards who works for Rocket and has to once again help his friend when one of the patient's mental powers begin to manifest after years of waiting. This is retconned, yet again, when he is seen working for Rocket and Groot to rescue Princess Lynx and fight Blackjack O'Hare, his brigade, and Lord Dyvyne.

Wal Rus in other media

Television
 Wal Rus appears in the Guardians of the Galaxy episode "We Are Family," voiced by Kevin Michael Richardson.

Film
 Wal Rus appears as a painting in Guardians of the Galaxy Vol. 2.

Walrus

Morris Walters
Morris Walters is a fictional character appearing in American comic books published by Marvel Comics.

Morris Walters is the father of Jennifer Walters and the husband of Elaine Walters.

Morris Walters in other media
 A variation of Morris Walters named Cliff Walters appears in The Incredible Hulk episode "Down Memory Lane", voiced by Stan Lee.
 Morris Walters appears in She-Hulk: Attorney at Law, portrayed by Mark Linn-Baker.

War

Abraham Kieros

Unnamed man

Gazer

War Dog
War Dog is a name used by several different dogs in Marvel Comics that have bonded with symbiotes. The character, created by Dan Slott, Paulo Siqueira and Ronan Cliquet, first appeared in The Amazing Spider-Man #654 (April 2011).

Samson
Samson is a German Shepherd. Samson is General Brad Dodge's pet dog from Washington, D.C. who temporarily bonded with the Venom symbiote to help Flash Thompson against the Spider King.

Second version
Another German Shepherd is Mercury Team's dog, trained extensively as a symbiotically enhanced duo with Chief petty officer Marcus Simms as Lasher in Doverton, Colorado. Mercury Team's symbiote soldiers are killed by Cletus Kasady, but the group's mascot survives and helps Deadpool defeat Carnage, by bonding with Phage, Lasher, Agony, and Riot before returning to the government.

Mitch
Mitch is Bullet's hunting dog who bonds with Phage to participate in a conspiracy alongside his "siblings", led by the Carnage symbiote involving the Friends of Humanity, only to be defeated by Thompson, Silence and Toxin, and taken into Alchemax's custody.

War Dog in other media
A dog loosely inspired by War Dog appears as an easter egg in the 2018 film Venom as a Papillion puppy named Gemini. The Venom symbiote bonds with the dog to locate Anne Weying and rescue Eddie Brock.

Grant Ward

Stewart Ward

Senator Stewart Ward is a fictional character in Marvel Comics. The character, created by Howard Mackie and John Romita Jr., first appears in Peter Parker: Spider-Man (vol. 2) #4.

Ward is a C.I.A. agent named Sentry who, with Seeker (Arthur Stacy) and Ranger, infiltrates HYDRA to destroy their alien experiments. Sentry is actually a double agent and Stacy and Ranger are forced to try and kill him. During the scuffle, Sentry is contaminated with an alien virus, the "Z'Nox", and becomes develops amnesia. Sentry reestablishes himself as Stewart Ward and becomes a successful senator for New York, secretly working to spread the alien virus. Eventually, Spider-Man and Stacy hit him with a pathogen that causes him to explode into an antidote, curing the infected.

Stewart Ward in other media
A character loosely inspired by Stewart Ward named Christian Ward appears in Agents of S.H.I.E.L.D., portrayed by Tim DeKay as an adult and Alex Neustaedter as a child. This version is the sadistic older brother of Grant and Thomas Ward and a candidate for the U.S. Senate. In flashbacks depicted in the episode "The Well", Christian tortured his brothers as a boy, which culminated in forcing Grant to torture Thomas. As an adult, Christian entered politics in an attempt to locate and shut down S.H.I.E.L.D. After Phil Coulson meets with Christian, offering him Grant in exchange for his support, Christian publicly reveals Grant's ties to Hydra. However, Grant escapes, ambushes Christian, and forces him to confess to his childhood wrongdoings before meeting with their parents, killing all three off-screen, and planting audio of the confession to frame their deaths as a murder-suicide.

War Machine

Warbird

Warlock

Adam Warlock

Warpath

Miles Warren

Raymond Warren
Raymond Warren is a fictional character appearing in American comic books published by Marvel Comics. The character, created by Stan Lee and Steve Ditko, first appeared in Amazing Fantasy #15 (August 1962). He is a science teacher of Midtown High School in Queens, New York, and the brother of Professor Miles Warren / Jackal. Warren has a multi-faceted attitude towards Peter Parker / Spider-Man, and is in fact the cause of his top student's early adventures against the Tinkerer, and the Living Brain.

Raymond Warren in other media
 The character, renamed Aaron Warren, appears in The Spectacular Spider-Man, voiced by Brian George. This version is depicted as East Indian, though he maintains his role as a science teacher at Midtown High School.
 A variation of Raymond Warren appears as the Jackal in Spider-Man, voiced by John DiMaggio. The uncle of Gwen Stacy / Ghost-Spider, this version is a scientist who specializes in genetics and experiments with mixing animal and human DNA, and has mastered cloning technology and created numerous clones of himself in case his identity was ever exposed. He first appears in "Osborn Academy", wherein he steals technology even in spite of Spider-Man's interference. He later intervenes in a feud between Herman Schultz and Clayton Cole and steals the pair's Shocker and Clash technology, only to be defeated by Spider-Man and forced to flee. In "A Day in the Life", Warren applies for work at Horizon High and is turned down by Max Modell due to his old experiments at Empire State University, but he pricks Aleksei Sytsevich with a hidden rhinoceros DNA serum before leaving. In "Party Animals", Warren applies for Osborn Academy and uses the Rhino as a bargaining chip. However, Spider-Man defeats the Rhino before confronting Warren who Gwen reverts to his human form before he is arrested. In "Ultimate Spider-Man", Warren hires Spencer Smythe to steal Oscorp's genetically modified spiders while a clone takes his place in prison. In "The Rise of Doc Ock" Pt. 3, Warren uses the Rhino to transform Osborn Academy's students and staff into additional Rhino monsters while another clone tries to assassinate Norman Osborn by self-destructing. In "The Rise of Doc Ock" Pt. 4, the imprisoned clone self-destructs in front of Spider-Man and the Ultimate Spider-Man while his real self conspires with Doctor Octopus. It is later revealed that Warren's secret lab underneath Midtown High School hid his army of Jackal clones powered by his genetically modified spiders before the lab is destroyed by the Sinister Six. In the five-part episode "Spider-Island", his genetically modified spiders' destruction releases a number of chemicals that mutate New York's population into the Man-Spiders; Warren attempts to take advantage of this, but is foiled by the Spider-Men, Harry Osborn and Anya Corazon. In "Generations", Warren uses his cloning technology with goblin sharks and helps the Dark Goblin fight the Spider Team, but is eventually defeated and taken into custody.

Warrior Woman

Warstar

Warstar is a warrior serving in the Royal Elite of the Shi'ar Imperial Guard. The character, created by Chris Claremont and John Byrne, first appeared in X-Men #137 (September 1980).

Warstar is actually two symbiotically linked sentient mechanoids, a small one named B'nee who can generate electricity and a large one named C’cil who is gigantic and immensely strong and durable. B'nee rides on C'cil's back.

Warstar joins in the Imperial Guard's trial by combat with the X-Men to decide the fate of the Phoenix. Warstar is then a traitor who served Lord Samedar, Deathbird, and the Brood in their conspiracy to overthrow Shi'ar Princess-Majestrix Lilandra and battle the X-Men. After defeating the Brood and the renegades, Lilandra resumes her position as the head of the Shi'ar Empire. Despite most of the Imperial Guard having joined with Deathbird against Lilandra, the team members are pardoned for their actions.

Deathbird later assumes control of the Shi'ar empire, On her behalf, Warstar battles Ch'od of the Starjammers; he is defeated, along with the other Imperial Guardsmen, by the X-Men and Starjammers.

During Operation Galactic Storm, Warstar fights Captain America in Arizona in an attempt to abduct Rick Jones. Warstar battles Captain America, Iron Man, and Wonder Man during the Kree-Shi'ar War. Warstar is defeated by Gilgamesh and She-Hulk. Incarcerated at Project Pegasus, Warstar comes into contact with fellow Guardsman Hobgoblin. Their teammates Nightside and Scintilla break into Pegasus and free Warstar and Hobogoblin. Hobgoblin impersonates the Kree geneticist Doctor Minerva, and induces the Kree Captain Atlas to accompany him aboard a Shi’ar ship, where the Kree are outnumbered by the Imperial Guard, who then claim Captain Marvel's Nega-Bands for themselves.

Years later, in the Maximum Security crossover, Warstar and fellow Guardsmen Hussar, Neutron, and Webwing are charged for their complicity in Deathbird's coup and sent to Earth, which has been turned into an intergalactic prison planet. The quartet joins with a rogue, D'Bari, in an attack on several X-Men, but are ultimately defeated. When the Maximum Security storyline resolves, all alien prisoners are removed from Earth, and Warstar, Hussar, and Neutron are later seen among the Imperial Guard again.

Warstar is ripped in half when the Guard foght for their new emperor, Vulcan, against the X-Men and Starjammers, but Warstar survives and is carried away by their fellow Guardsmen.

During the war between Vulcan's regime and the Inhuman-ruled Kree Empire, Warstar is seen menacing Nova Corps Centurions on the Kree planet Kaiphas, but is stopped by Nova Prime Richard Rider. Both B'nee and C'cil are apparently decapitated by the Nova Prime, with B'nee's head completely missing and C'cil's reduced to a smoking mass.

As a mechanoid symbiote, Warstar is difficult to actually kill, and he appears in a number of later Imperial Guard missions, including "Infinity," the "Trial of Jean Grey," "Time Runs Out," and the return of Thanos.

Warstar in other media
 Warstar appears in the X-Men episodes "The Phoenix Saga" and "The Dark Phoenix Saga".
 Warstar appears as a mini-boss in Marvel: Ultimate Alliance, voiced by John Cygan.

Warcat

Vince Marcus

Martin Reyna

Washout

Wasp

Janet van Dyne

Hank Pym

Hope van Dyne

Nadia van Dyne

Mayor Waters

Anna Watson

Anna May Watson is a fictional character, a supporting character of Spider-Man. The character, created by Stan Lee and Steve Ditko, first appeared in The Amazing Spider-Man #15. She is depicted as Mary Jane Watson's aunt, an old friend of May Parker, and a recurring character in various Spider-Man titles. She is depicted as filling the same role of surrogate mother in Mary Jane's life as May does for Peter Parker. For a period of time when May was believed to be dead, she moved in with Peter and Mary Jane. While initially very supportive of her niece's husband, she becomes suspicious with Peter's long absences and unreliability.

Anna Watson in other media
Anna Watson appeared in the 1994 Spider-Man series, voiced by Majel Barrett. She continuously voices her disapproval of Peter due to the latter's absences and attraction for danger.
Anna Watson appears in The Spectacular Spider-Man, voiced by Kath Soucie. Much like the comics, she colludes with May to have Peter and Mary Jane meet.
Anna Watson is mentioned in the Spider-Man episode "Horizon High".

Mary Jane Watson

Wave
Wave (Pearl Pangan) is a Cebuano superhero appearing in the Marvel Universe. The character was created by writer Greg Pak and artist Leinil Francis Yu as a water-based superhero protecting the Philippines.

Wave made her debut in the limited series War of the Realms, New Agents of Atlas in May 2019 and reprised her role as a member in the follow-on limited series Agents of Atlas (vol. 3). She also appeared in the series Aero teaming up with the title character.

Pearl Pangan is a native of Cebu City and had a natural affinity for the water since she was a child. She is recruited for her swimming strength to conduct experiments with a company called Alontek. When Triumph Division raids the site and shuts down the experiments, she discovers she is capable of hydrokinesis (ability to control water). Triumph Division recruits her to protect the Philippines, but later fires her for abandoning her post in the War of the Realms. During the War of the Realms, Wave and the Agents of Atlas battle Sindr, the daughter of Surtur, to prevent her from melting the polar ice caps and turning Asia into New Muspelheim.

Wave in other media
 Wave is an unlockable character in Marvel Future Fight.
 Wave is an unlockable hero in Marvel Super War.
Pearl Pangan is one of Peter Parker's friends in Spider-Man: Freshman Year.

Kate Waynesboro
Dr. Katherine "Kate" Waynesboro was created by Bill Mantlo and Sal Buscema, and has been primarily a supporting character of the Hulk. She first appeared in The Incredible Hulk (vol. 2) #287.

Bruce Banner hires Waynesboro as a laboratory assistant during a period of time when Banner's rational persona controls the Hulk, and eventually enters into a romantic relationship with him. During a battle with the Abomination, Banner discovers that Waynesboro is also an agent of S.H.I.E.L.D., sent as a "minder" to ensure that Banner didn't lose control of the Hulk again, which called her actions, including their romance, into question.

The Abomination then kidnaps Waynesboro and offers her as a hostage to a faction of A.I.M. that had recently taken over MODOK's base, where she is subjected to the same process that had created MODOK, dubbing her "Ms. MODOK". MODOK states his intention to take her as a consort, to which she assents. When the Hulk objects, MODOK attacks him and atomizes the Abomination as a demonstration of power. Aghast at MODOK's casual murder, Ms. MODOK turns against him, and MODOK forces her back into the transformation chamber, restoring her to her original state.

Waynesboro quits S.H.I.E.L.D. to continue her personal and professional relationship with Banner, but after his return from the so-called "Secret Wars", it is apparent that Banner is losing control of the Hulk just as S.H.I.E.L.D. feared. Waynesboro returns to S.H.I.E.L.D. to help capture the Hulk, but ultimately leaves, unable to bear witnessing Banner's failing struggle to regain dominance

Waynseboro is later seen receiving information regarding the Warbound members from their former teammate "King Miek" to find their biggest weaknesses. Three weeks later she is sent to aid fellow S.H.I.E.L.D. agents in capturing the Warbound, but the group kidnap her to help one of their wounded members. She is caught in a plot by the Leader to irradiate the world with gamma rays, working with the Warbound to stop the threat. She gains Warbound member Hiroim's Oldstrong powers when he perishes in battle. She meets with Norman Osborn to get the Warbound pardoned for their crimes during World War Hulk, only to find out that he already has, being "a big believer in the concept of redemption".

H.A.M.M.E.R. captures Waynesboro to extract the Oldpower for their own use, but Banner and Skaar assault the facility and rescue her.

Weapon H

Wendigo

Werewolf by Night

James Wesley
James Wesley is a minor character in Marvel Comics. The character, created by Frank Miller and David Mazzucchelli, first appeared in Daredevil #227 (February 1986). He is a faithful assistant of the Kingpin (Wilson Fisk).

He is ordered by the Kingpin to locate Nuke for the sole purpose of causing Hell's Kitchen's destruction. After Daredevil saves Hell's Kitchen, Wesley fears that said events would connect the Kingpin to the authorities. He comes back under his employer when tasked with handling reporter Sarah Dewey's affairs, and is also revealed to double as a criminal lawyer for anyone under his boss's payroll.

James Wesley in other media

Film
A character named Wesley Owen Welch appears in the film adaptation Daredevil, portrayed by Leland Orser. Portrayed as squeamish and very cowardly, he's the Kingpin's right-hand man and personal assistant. He reports Bullseye's failure to the Kingpin, and attempts to encourage an increase of security to deal with Daredevil's imminent arrival. When the Kingpin resists, he leaves the building and goes to a bar where Wesley is confronted by Detective Nick Manolis (in the extended cut) offering a plea bargain.

Television
In the first season of Daredevil, James Wesley is portrayed by Toby Leonard Moore. More confident and snarky than his film counterpart, this version acts as an intermediary with Fisk's various associates: Leland Owlsley, Nobu Yoshioka, Madame Gao, and the Ranskahov brothers (Anatoly and Vladimir). He has a very close relationship with Fisk, being very loyal and respectful as well as even offering helpful and emotional advice similar to Vanessa Mariana to an extent that Fisk describes him in season 3 as being "like a son" to him.

Late in the season, Wesley finds out that Karen Page and Ben Urich have spoken to Fisk's mother, Marlene Vistain. As Page now knows too much about Fisk's past activities, Wesley personally kidnaps her and attempts to intimidate her into silence  by threatening to have her friends and family killed. When he is distracted by the sound of his phone picking up an incoming call from Fisk, Karen takes advantage of the distraction to grab his gun and shoot him to death. Fisk is devastated by Wesley's death, while Karen is traumatized from taking Wesley's life.

In the third season, Karen reveals details of Wesley's death to Fisk in an attempt to provoke him into attacking her on tape, so the FBI will send him back to prison for violating his parole. The gambit fails, and Fisk subsequently has Benjamin "Dex" Poindexter carry out a retaliatory hit on Karen.

Nicodemus West

Western Kid

Evangeline Whedon

Whiplash

Mark Scarlotti

Leeann Foreman

Unnamed Woman and Man

Construct

Anton Vanko

Female Blacklash

Whirlwind

Abraham Whistler

White Fox
White Fox (Ami Han) is a fictional Korean superhero appearing in the Marvel Universe. The character was created in 2014 by Korean writer/artist Young hoon Ko for the Korean webtoon Avengers: Electric Rain as Marvel explored the potential of the vertically scrolling format with Daum. The character proved popular, and she was brought to the American comics market.

White Fox came to the American comic market when she was featured throughout the 2015 Contest of Champions story. She made some short appearances from 2016 to 2017 in other books. In 2019, she began having regular appearances in Domino: Hotshots and Agents of Atlas titles.

Ami Han is the last of the Kumiho, a race of shapeshifting nine-tail foxes, and a member of the South Korean National Intelligence Service. Her Kumiho powers allow her to transform into White Fox, giving her enhanced senses, the ability to communicate with animals, and retractable claws on her fingers. She is also skilled in hand-to-hand combat.

White Fox in other media
White Fox is a playable character in Marvel: Future Fight.

White Dragon

White Dragon I

White Dragon II

White Dragon III

White Jennie
Jennifer "White Jennie" Royce is the former secretary for Heroes for Hire, the detective agency helmed by Luke Cage and Danny Rand. After the agency disbanded, she was convicted of the murder of her abusive boyfriend, Eugene "Crime-Buster" Mason. She tricked Cage and Rand to help her with her case, which was a front for her criminal activities with Black Mariah.

White Rabbit

White Tiger

Hector Ayala

Heroes for Hire

Kasper Cole

Angela del Toro

Ava Ayala

White Wolf

Hunter the White Wolf is the name of a fictional character in Marvel Comics. The character, created by Christopher Priest and Mark Texeira, first appeared in Black Panther (vol. 3) #4 (February 1999).

Whiteout

Debra Whitman

Whizzer

Robert Frank

James Sanders

Stanley Stewart

Wiccan

Wild Child

Wild Thing
Wild Thing (Rina Logan) is a mutant character in the alternate future MC2, daughter of Elektra and Wolverine. Created by Tom DeFalco and Ron Lim, the character first appeared in J2 #5 (February 1999). She had her own series for a time, but due to low sales it was canceled after issue #5.

For a short period of time, Wild Thing is a member of a superhero team composed of herself, Magneta, and Daze, but she quits when Magneta becomes villainous. When Loki kidnaps several of Earth's heroes (including her father), Wild Thing's enhanced senses are pivotal in finding them.

Rina possesses many of her father's mutant abilities, including accelerated healing and superhuman senses, strength, reflexes and endurance. She also has a set of "Psi-Claws", created from psychokinetic energy, which, although they appear similar to her father's adamantium claws, usually inflict damage on a mental rather than a physical level. However, if she concentrates hard enough, her claws can actually slice through steel and stone. Her fighting skills are impressive, as her parents have trained her in martial arts. Her skills are sufficient to enable her to engage J2 in hand-to-hand combat and hold her own, despite the advantages his much greater strength provides him.

Alex Wilder

Geoffrey and Catherine Wilder

Wildside

Wildstreak

Jason Wilkes

Will o' the Wisp

Riri Williams

Willow
Willow is a fictional mutant character created by Marvel Comics for their Marvel 2099 run X-Nation 2099. This short-lived series only lasted six issues before ending. Willow can perfectly mimic the shape of other beings, although her facial markings remain prevalent.

In the year 2099, a young girl named Winter Frost gets a job at a local amusement park, Million Palms Amusement Park, which is actually presided over by a king and a queen. One day Queen Perigrine disappears, and her body is found at the bottom of the Tunnel of Love. King Avian becomes suspicious of everyone and requires genetic scans of all incoming tourists before they can enter. Anyone with genetic anomalies is imprisoned in an underground labyrinth and subjected to many tests and acts of torture.

Winter is discovered to be a mutant and is imprisoned. Among the other inmates is a tormented girl named Willow. The two girls became friends, but Willow os taken away by Avian. Winter tries to escape to save her friend, but is discovered. For her actions she is sentenced to public execution. When she is taken to be executed, she sees the missing queen, who is revealed to be Willow using her shapeshifter abilities. Willow orchestrates her and Winter's escape from the facility.

The pair arrive at Halo City, the home of X-Nation, and join the group. They move into a home for indigent children which is maintained by the 'Sisterhood of the Howling Commandos'. Cerebra, one of the members of the current X-Men, assists the Commandos in teaching the children. The group spends downtime at 'milk' bars, as a new process had been invented to give dairy products narcotic qualities.

Some time later, Avian decides to mount a mission to recapture Willow in a bid to be the first to find the fabled Mutant Messiah. He attacks the children and captures Willow. Wanting to rescue their friend, X-Nation decides to infiltrate the Million Palms facility and save her. However, their fledgling efforts end in their capture and subsequent torture. Willow is able to escape and, is able to help liberate her friends by impersonating Avian. 

Upon their return home they find that Halo City has been blown up by the Atlantean army, and the city is being flooded due to the Phalanx melting the polar ice caps. The entire Sisterhood has been killed in a battle that took many Atlantean lives. Exodus awakes from another century-long slumber and tries to make X-Nation his Acolytes. They refuse and are subsequently beaten. The entire group realize Exodus is not to be trusted when he refuses to help save the human population of Halo City. Those who survive are teleported away by Mademoiselle Strange.

They travel to the Savage Land, along with many other humans and mutants, as it is now the last inhabitable place on earth. They do what they can to begin to form a society there. Willow, along with Nostromo, Bloodhawk, La Lunatica, communications expert Jade Ryuteki, Mr. Hodge and a scientist named Mr. Winn form part of an exploration team into the jungles. Along the way they stumble upon an alien space craft and become trapped inside of it. Willow shapeshifts into one of the previous alien owners of the ship to allow them to escape, but she becomes trapped in that form. With the alien mind taking over, La Lunatica slams her into the water to protect the rest of the group. Nostromo dives in after her and succeeds in subduing her feral persona and returning her to normal, but he does not resurface. Luna dives after him, but only finds a strange cocoon at the bottom. Nostromo "hatches" in full Phalanx form and some of President Doom's operatives arrive to bring the boy to Doom. Mr. Winn turns out to be Phalanx and slays all of Doom's men. The heroes end up the last people standing as Winn teleports away with Nostromo.

They escape back to the 'Last Refuge'. Willow, transformed into a green flying creature, tries to smooth relations with the mutant hating Hodge, as both had lost a friend with the betrayal of Mr. Winn. On the outskirts of the city, the expedition is confronted with another Phalanx warrior, threatening to assimilate them all.

Later, Willow is among the human/mutant coalition shown trying to rebuild the Savage Land settlement. She is the one who realizes that Uproar, who had become lost when kidnapped along with Wulff, has been missing for some time.

Jim Wilson

Paul and Darlene Wilson
Paul Wilson and Darlene Wilson are fictional characters appearing in Marvel Comics. Both characters first appeared in Captain America #277 (October 1982), and created by J.M. DeMatteis and Mike Zeck. They are the parents of Sam Wilson / Falcon and Sarah Wilson. Paul was a minister while Darlene was supportive to different religions and comparative theology. However, Paul is killed trying to break up a neighborhood fight, and later Darlene is shot and killed by a mugger.

Alternate versions of Paul Wilson
Abraham "Abe" Wilson in the 1996 "Heroes Reborn" universe has fought alongside Captain America during World War II, but is later killed by Master Man's army.

Darlene Wilson in other media
Darlene Wilson appears in the Avengers Assemble episode "One Little Thing", voiced by Cree Summer.

Sarah Wilson
Sarah Wilson is a fictional character appearing in Marvel Comics. The character first appeared in Captain America #134 (February 1971), and created by J.M. DeMatteis and Mike Zeck. She is the sister of Sam Wilson / Falcon. Sarah is shown as supportive of her brother's personal problems as she went though similar things as well.

Sarah Wilson in other media
Sarah Wilson appears in the MCU miniseries The Falcon and the Winter Soldier, portrayed by Adepero Oduye.

Wind Dancer

Windshear
Windshear (Colin Ashworth Hume) is a mutant superhero and member of Alpha Flight. Created by Fabian Nicieza and Michael Bair, the character first appeared in Alpha Flight #87 (April 1991). He has the ability to project "hard-air" molecules, which he can use to create constructs, release as concussive force, and propel himself in flight. He was born in Canada, but grew up in Britain.

Hume was hired by Roxxon Oil Corp and given a battlesuit that allowed him to control his powers more thoroughly. When he was unable to defeat a machine-creature at Roxxon's Denver Energy Research station, the company called in Box and Diamond Lil. The trio and Forge discovered James MacDonald Hudson at the machine's core. Hume, upset about Roxxon's practices, quit the company and returned to Canada with the members of Alpha Flight, and was soon accepted onto the team, first on a probationary basis and later as a full member. He was later appointed the Chief Administrator of Alpha Flight. He was one of the superheroes who vanished during the Infinity Gauntlet saga when Thanos used the Infinity Gauntlet's power to sacrifice half of the population of the universe to Death. He appears in Infinity Crusade as one of the Goddess' mind-controlled lackeys.

Eventually, the Canadian government disbands Department H and the Flight programs, and Hume returns to England. Hume set up a curio shop to sell "hard air" constructs. When the Thunderbolts were investigating a series of murders committed with bullets created out of hard air, they investigated Hume and learned of Roxxon's connection.

He is among those depowered by M-Day, but continues to fight crime in Toronto under the alias Chinook.

Wing

Colleen Wing

Wyatt Wingfoot

Winter Soldier

Norah Winters
Norah Winters is a fictional supporting character of Spider-Man. Created by Joe Kelly and Chris Bachalo, the character first appeared in The Amazing Spider-Man #575. She is a reporter for the Daily Bugle. She has worked with Peter Parker on numerous occasions. She is romantically involved with Randy Robertson for a time, but he breaks up with her when she puts her career above his wellbeing, staying on the sidelines to film him fighting the Hobgoblin when she has ready access to a bag of the Goblin's pumpkin bombs. She soon starts dating Phil Urich, who was secretly the Hobgoblin and had plotted her and Randy's breakup. When Phil's villain identity is revealed in a television broadcast, she is fired from her position at the Daily Bugle.

Wipeout

Pete Wisdom

Romany Wisdom

Witchfire
Witchfire (Ananym) is a fictional character appearing in American comic books published by Marvel Comics. The character is depicted as a former superhero, now supervillain, and magician. She was a former member of Gamma Flight and was eventually recruited into Beta Flight. She is the daughter of X-Men villain Belasco.

Wither

Witness

Wizard

Wiz Kid

W'Kabi
W'Kabi is a fictional Wakandan, created by Roy Thomas, who first appeared in Avengers #62. The character is King T'Challa's loyal second-in-command.

He and Zuri are killed by Morlun trying to protect the wounded T'Challa, and are later buried next to each other.

W'Kabi in other media
W'Kabi's voice is briefly heard in the Iron Man: Armored Adventures episode "Line of Fire" after T'Challa contacts him.
W'Kabi appears in the Black Panther series, voiced by Phil Morris.
W'Kabi appears in the film Black Panther, portrayed by Daniel Kaluuya. He is depicted as T'Challa's best friend, Okoye's husband, and the chief of the Border Tribe. Ulysses Klaue had killed his parents decades earlier while stealing vibranium. As he is responsible for the borders of Wakanda, W'Kabi and his guards have trained armored rhinoceroses as shock cavalry. W'Kabi loses faith in T'Challa when he fails to capture Klaue, and supports Erik Killmonger when he subsequently usurps the throne. During the final battle, Okoye confronts W'Kabi when he tries to trample M'Baku with an armored white rhinoceros, saying she values Wakanda more than their love. Not wanting to die by Okoye's hands or take her life, W'Kabi surrenders and the rest of the Border Tribe does the same. In Black Panther: Wakanda Forever, it is mentioned that W'Kabi is in prison for his part in Killmonger's coup.

Wolf Cub
Wolf Cub (Nicholas Gleason) is a fictional character and mutant created by Brian K. Vaughan and Lee Ferguson, and first appeared in Chamber #1.

Gleason possesses a permanent werewolf-like form that imbues him with enhanced senses, strength, speed, agility, reflexes, coordination, balance and endurance. Additionally, Gleason possesses razor-sharp claws and fangs, a full-body coat of fur, and pointed ears.

After the deaths of his parents, Gleason is targeted by anti-mutant assassins. He is rescued by X-Men members Chamber and Cyclops, and subsequently enrolled at the Xavier Institute. After accidentally injuring Havok, he runs away from the Institute and is invited to join a group called Dominant Species by Maximus Lobo. He declines, and later rejoins the school.

He is placed on the Paragons training squad, along with fellow students Match, Trance, Preview, DJ, and Pixie. After the squad loses their original advisor, Wolfsbane, they are assigned a new mentor, Magma. In the wake of House of M, the student population of the school is dramatically reduced, causing the squad system to be dissolved and the remaining students to be merged into one group. Gleason is one of a handful of students to retain their mutant abilities.

Wolf Cub, along with Anole, Loa, Pixie, Rockslide, and Match, are told a frightening "ghost story" by their fellow student Blindfold. This is later revealed to not be a story, but rather a vision of things past and of things to come. The students are transported to the dimension Limbo and attacked by a mob of demons.

Wolf Cub is recruited to the Young X-Men after Cyclops intervenes in his attempts to kill Maximus Lobo, former leader of the Dominant Species and an M-Day casualty, as revenge for his manipulation of Nicholas. The team is given orders to take down the original New Mutants, who have gone rogue, and ordered to kill them if necessary. When Cyclops is revealed to actually be Donald Pierce in disguise, Nicholas is shaken by his own indiscretion when following orders and his willingness to kill Magma during their confrontation. The Young X-Men and the New Mutants engage Donald Pierce, and Wolf Cub is fatally wounded; his final words are a request that the team not kill Pierce in revenge.

When the X-Men made Krakoa a mutant paradise, Wolf Cub was among the revived mutants living there.

Wolf Spider
Wolf Spider is an alias used by minor characters appearing in American comic books published by Marvel Comics.

Wolf Spiders
The Wolf Spiders, created by Butch Guice and Ed Brubaker, and first appeared in Captain America #617 (June 2011), are a special ops team trained by the Red Room. 

The first candidate was Niko Constantin, an assassin who is imprisoned in a gulag (alongside Boris Bullski and Unicorn) where he's the sadistic leader of his own gang and sold out Bucky Barnes / Winter Soldier to Andre Rostov. 

The Wolf Spiders later act as the Red Widow's enforcers, trying to assassinate White Widow but are stopped by Black Widow. The Wolf Spiders are also defeated by Captain America and Iron Man as well as the Winter Hulk during a conspiracy to eliminate Namor.

Spider individual
An unidentified multiverse individual, created by Dan Slott and Olivier Coipel, and first appeared in The Amazing Spider-Man (vol. 3) #11 (December 2014), is a Spider-type superhero with werewolf features. He is killed by Karn of the Inheritors.

Wolf Spider in other media
A variation of Wolf Spider appears in the Ultimate Spider-Man four-part episode "Return to the Spider-Verse", voiced by Christopher Daniel Barnes. This version is an alternate universe doppelganger of Peter Parker, who became a supervillain and developed four organic, spider leg-like appendages. He seeks to obtain the Siege Perilous' fragments from across the multiverse and absorb the powers of his heroic counterparts for himself. He initially succeeds, but gets overloaded by his doppelgangers' energies and shattered across the multiverse.

Wolfsbane

Wolverine

Wonder Man

Wong

Wong-Chu

Jimmy Woo

Woodgod
Woodgod is a genetically-engineered sentient life-form resembling a satyr. He was created using cloning techniques by combining human and animal DNA.

Wraith

Brian DeWolff

Hector Rendoza

Zak-Del

Yuri Watanabe

Wrecker

Leiko Wu

Leiko Wu is a fictional secret agent in Marvel Comics. The character, created by Doug Moench and Paul Gulacy, first appeared in Master of Kung Fu #33 (October 1975).

Leiko Wu is a Chinese-British MI-6 agent. Upon joining, she entered a romantic relationship with Clive Reston, but she left him for Simon Bretnor, who later became the villain Mordillo. She soon joined back up with Reston along with his new allies Black Jack Tarr and Shang-Chi, the latter of whom she developed feelings for. Together, they defeated Mordillo. She continued to go on several missions with Shang-Chi and Reston which would usually cause awkward tension among them. Wu would also help Shang-Chi defeat his father, Fu Manchu, on a couple of occasions.

Sometime after her relationship with Shang-Chi ended, Leiko is murdered by Razor Fist while working undercover in the triads for MI-6. Leiko's murder prompts Shang-Chi to return to London, where he reunites with Tarr and his former enemy Skull Crusher, who alleges that Leiko planned to defect MI-6 for him. When Razor Fist's employer is revealed to be White Dragon, Skull-Crusher's rival triad clan leader, Shang-Chi and Skull-Crusher arrive at White Dragon's estate, but are captured by Shang-Chi's brother Midnight Sun, White Dragon's master. Midnight Sun decapitates White Dragon and Skull-Crusher for the Mao Shan Pai ritual, which requires the heads of the triad leaders. Instead of granting him the powers that the ritual would grant him, the spell instead resurrects Leiko due to Skull-Crusher secretly making her the leader of his clan before her death. Leiko uses her newfound powers to main Razor Fist and summons the spirits of the dead triad leaders to drag Midnight Sun back to their realm. Shang-Chi is unable to bring his former lover back to her normal self and she flees when Tarr arrives at the estate with backup.  Leiko is later seen taking a photo that Shang-Chi leaves behind at her grave of the two of them.

Leiko eventually resumes her duties with MI-6. When MI-6 discovers that Zheng Zu's (Fu Manchu's real identity) organization is active again, Leiko visits Shang-Chi at his new residence in San Francisco to warn him, only for the two to be attacked by unknown assailants. The two are rescued by Shang-Chi's previously unknown half-siblings, Brother Sabre and Sister Dagger, who reveal that Shang-Chi has been chosen by Zheng Zu's spirit as the new Supreme Commander of the Five Weapons Society, the true name of their father's organization. Sabre and Dagger request Shang-Chi's help in overthrowing Sister Hammer, the illegitimate leader of the Society and his long-lost full sister, Shi-Hua, who sent the assassins to kill her brother in order to consolidate her rule. Leiko flies Shang-Chi back to London, where the House of the Deadly Staff and Sister Hammer are located. Despite Leiko's offer to help, Shang-Chi insists on confronting his sister alone.  

Leiko provides Shang-Chi with information via phone call regarding a map leading to his uncle Zheng Yi's grave and attempts to prevent an MI5-led raid on the House of the Deadly Staff; the leading officer ignores her warnings and leads an assault, only for him and his forces to be massacred by Shi-Hua and her henchmen. When Shi-Hua and her jiangshi army attack London, Lekio and MI-6 help defend the city with Shang-Chi and his siblings. After the army is defeated and Shi-Hua is subdued, Leiko attempts to shoot her in the head, but the bullet is caught by Shang-Chi, who allows his sister to flee.

While Shang-Chi is still in London, Leiko approaches him on behalf of MI-6 and asks him to steal the mystical Equinox Blade from the British Museum before it could be auctioned off due to the danger the sword poses. Leiko guides Shang-Chi via earpiece through the museum's security systems, but he encounters Lady Deathstrike, who had just stolen the blade and used its power to steal the souls of the museum's guards. After a prolonged struggle and with Leiko's help, Shang-Chi knocks Deathstrike out of a window and destroys the blade, freeing the souls it consumed to return to its victims.  For his trouble, Leiko treats Shang-Chi to gelato.

Leiko and Shang-Chi spend holiday together in Seoul, where they witness several gas bombs detonate across the city, turning victims into trees. After helping Shang-Chi and White Fox rescue civilians from a gas explosion, Leiko receives a broadcast of similar explosions happening in major cities worldwide. The three track the origin of one of the diffusors to an A.I.M. laboratory in London, where they encounter scientist Jessa Chen, who claims she and other scientists are being forced against their will to create the bioweapon, named the Gelsemium Molecule. Leiko takes Chen to safety while Shang-Chi and White Fox fight A.I.M. guards. While they are alone, Chen reveals herself as Doctor Gelsemium, the true mastermind behind the Gelsemium Molecule and uses her tree-like physiology to restrain Leiko before exposing her to a Molecule sample. Gelsemium takes Leiko to another laboratory in the Pacific Northwest, where Leiko begins transforming into a tree. Shang-Chi and White Fox find Leiko through her tracker and fight Gelsemium.  Leiko is able to free herself and uses her own tree physiology to free Gelsemium's test subjects and fight her. After Gelsemium is defeated, Leiko is cured with an antidote which later supplied to Gelsemium's victims around the world.

Powers and abilities 
She possesses supernatural powers since her resurrection and knows martial arts, espionage, and firearms.

Alternate versions of Leiko Wu
Leiko Wu exists in the Ultimate Marvel Universe. She is hired by Shang-Chi's father to hire other people to bring him back to China alive, and develops an interest in Shang-Chi after he stops some men who stole her bags.

Wundarr the Aquarian

Wysper

References

Marvel Comics characters: W, List of